Allen V. Evans is an American politician. Evans is the West Virginia House of Delegates Member from the 54th District which represents Mineral County and Grant County. He also serves as the Minority Chair of the Agriculture committee.

External links
 CapWiz Political
 WV Legislature

1939 births
Farmers from West Virginia
Living people
People from Grant County, West Virginia
People from Harrisonburg, Virginia
Republican Party members of the West Virginia House of Delegates
21st-century American politicians
American United Methodists